Salisbury Turnpike Bridge is a historic stone arch bridge located at Rhinebeck, Dutchess County, New York. It was built in 1858 and is a single span stone masonry structure built of mortared random fieldstone.

It was added to the National Register of Historic Places in 1987.

References

Road bridges on the National Register of Historic Places in New York (state)
Bridges completed in 1858
Transportation buildings and structures in Dutchess County, New York
National Register of Historic Places in Dutchess County, New York
Stone arch bridges in the United States
1858 establishments in New York (state)